Mardehek (also romanized as Mardehak and Mardehk; also known as Mardeh) is the city and capital of Jebalbarez Jonubi District, in Anbarabad County, Kerman Province, Iran.  At the 2006 census, its population was 1,912, in 407 families.

References

Populated places in Anbarabad County

Cities in Kerman Province